St. Mary's Episcopal Church is a historic church building in Weyanoke, Louisiana.

St. Mary's Episcopal Church was built in 1857 to serve approximately 20 plantation families in the remote Tunica area north of St. Francisville, Louisiana. The design is attributed to New York architect Frank Wills, a prominent 19th century proponent of the Gothic Revival. Wills' belief in the English Country church as the ideal model for American Episcopal congregations can be clearly seen in the design of St. Mary's. Two other churches by Wills are known in the region, Christ Church in Napoleonville, Louisiana and the Chapel of the Cross near Madison, Mississippi. In 1858 the church was consecrated by Bishop (later Confederate General) Leonidas Polk, the "Fighting Bishop" of Civil War fame. The church was built on the Old East Tunica Road on 5 acres donated by Sarah Mulford, The title description is written "per aversionem" so that the boundaries cannot be identified exactly. In 1928 State Highway 66 was built about 1/2 mile west of the church and the old road was abandoned, leaving the church with no vehicular access, except by private farm roads. The church was deconsecrated in 1947, and today stands empty, gradually being overtaken by the surrounding forest, which has completely overgrown the graveyard north of the church and the old roadway.

St. Mary's Church was listed on the National Register of Historic Places in 1980. Its nomination describes it as " an elegant and generally well proportioned example of mid-19th century Gothic Revival ecclesiastical architecture. It is one of only about twelve such examples in the state."

References

Episcopal church buildings in Louisiana
Churches on the National Register of Historic Places in Louisiana
Gothic Revival church buildings in Louisiana
Churches completed in 1857
Churches in West Feliciana Parish, Louisiana
19th-century Episcopal church buildings
National Register of Historic Places in West Feliciana Parish, Louisiana
1857 establishments in Louisiana